Zoudenbalch is the sports facility where Eredivisie-side FC Utrecht trains and where the women football team FC Utrecht played its games. It currently serves as the home base of the FC Utrecht youth teams and Jong FC Utrecht.

The sports complex is named after Utrecht's Zoudenbalch family.

References

FC Utrecht
Sports venues in Utrecht (city)
Football venues in the Netherlands